Psychoporn (or ) is a Taiwanese pornographic film studio, catering primarily to the Asian market.

History 
In 2019, Steve and Dave co-founded Psychoporn in California. Psychoporn is also one of the early teams that invested in Taiwanese adult film production, and undertook the shooting needs of SWAG. Compared with the other Taiwanese production teams that use cellphone or small DV camera to shoot films, the studio uses ultra-high resolution and has multiple roles such as photography, production, and filmmakers to produce the films. 

The studio uses ultra-high quality 6K movies as the main axis, its core value is the "Mind Fuck" of psychologically feeling sex. In addition to establishing a base in California, there is also a studio in Taiwan, and plans to enter the Japanese market. Psychoporn has released free 4K versions of porn videos on major porn sites such as XVideos and Pornhub. As of October 2021, it has accumulated 100 million viewing.

Ref 

Pornographic film studios